Ottokar Eugen Nováček (13 May 1866 – 3 February 1900) was an Austro-Hungarian violinist and composer of Czech descent. He is perhaps best known for his work Perpetuum Mobile (Perpetual Motion), written in 1895.

Life 
Nováček was born at Weißkirchen, southern Austrian Empire (today Serbia). He studied successfully with his father Martin Joseph Nováček, with Jakob Dont in Vienna (1880–83), and with Henry Schradieck and Brodsky at the Leipzig Conservatory, where he won the Mendelssohn Prize in 1885. He played in the Leipzig Gewandhaus Orchestra and in the Brodsky Quartet, originally as second violin and later as viola. He subsequently immigrated to the United States, where he was a member of the Boston Symphony Orchestra under Arthur Nikisch (1891) and was appointed principal viola in the Damrosch Orchestra, New York (189293). He also played in the re-formed Brodsky Quartet.

In 1899, after a heart condition forced him to retire from playing, he devoted himself to composition. His works include a piano concerto (1894, dedicated to, and first performed by, Ferruccio Busoni), Perpetuum mobile (Perpetual Motion) for violin and orchestra (1895), three string quartets (published in 1890, 1898 and 1904), eight Concerto caprices and other works for violin and piano, and six songs to texts by Leo Tolstoy. He died in New York City in 1900.

Family lineage 
 Martin (Joseph) Nováček (1834, Horaschdowitz, Royal Bohemia, Imp.-R. Austria1906, Temesvár, Hungary) ∞ Maria Hildebrand
 Rudolf Nováček (7 April 1860, Fehértemplom  12 August 1929, Prague), a Militärkapellmeister and composer
 Ottokar Nováček
 Karl / Karel Nováček (1868, Fehértemplom  1929, Budapest)
 Victor Nováček (1875, Temesvár  1914, Helsinki)

External links 
 Free scores by Ottokar Novacek at the International Music Score Library Project 
 http://www.austriaca.at/ml/musik_N/Novacek_Brueder.xml
 http://www.edition-musik-suedost.de/html/novacek_ottokar.html (German)
 http://www.edition-musik-suedost.de/html/novacek_martin.html About Martin (Joseph) Novacek (1834 - 1906)

1866 births
1900 deaths
19th-century classical composers
19th-century classical violinists
19th-century Austrian musicians
19th-century Austrian male musicians
19th-century Czech musicians
19th-century Hungarian musicians
Austro-Hungarian musicians
Czech Romantic composers
Czech male classical composers
Czech classical violinists
Male classical violinists
Mendelssohn Prize winners
Austrian people of Czech descent
Hungarian people of Czech descent
People from the Kingdom of Hungary
People from Bela Crkva